Patricia Colleen Murphy is an American poet and teacher. She founded Superstition Review at Arizona State University, where she teaches creative writing and magazine production. She won the 2019 Press 53 Award for Poetry for her second collection Bully Love. She won the 2016 May Swenson Poetry Award judged by Stephen Dunn, and her poetry collection Hemming Flames was published by University Press of Colorado in summer 2016. Hemming Flames went on to win the 2017 Milt Kessler Award for Poetry. Her work has appeared in many literary journals, including The Iowa Review, Quarterly West, American Poetry Review, North American Review, Northwest Poetry, Third Coast, Black Warrior Review, Natural Bridge and others. Her work has received awards from the Associated Writing Programs and the Academy of American Poets, Gulf Coast, Bellevue Literary Review, The Madison Review, Glimmer Train Press, and The Southern California Review. A chapter of her memoir-in-progress was published as a chapbook by New Orleans Review.

References

External links 
 Official site
 Roen, Maureen. (8 March 2016). "This is what a professional writer looks like," ASU Now. 
  "Prestigious Honors and Awards for Eight Women in Higher Education" WIA Report. 2 June 2016
 May Swenson Poetry Award
 Superstition Review

Year of birth missing (living people)
Living people
Arizona State University faculty
American women poets
American women academics
21st-century American women